Taichi master (太極張三豐) is a classic Rediffusion Television series aired in Hong Kong in 1980.  The series helped boost the popularity of Rediffusion TV right before the station was converting over to become ATV.  Numerous sequels and spawns have followed since its release.(such as The Tai-chi Master 2 遊俠張三豐.)

Summary
The story revolves around Yuan-bo (Alex Man) who starts off as a young monk from Shaolin temple with some knowledge of T'ai chi ch'uan martial art.   He soon meets general Chang Yuchun and become a student of To Cek-lun (陶石麟).  Yuan-bo falls in love with his daughter To Choi-yi (陶綵衣).   A number of adversaries later tried to kill Yuan-bo.  He can only fight them off by becoming the supreme Taoist Tai chi master.

Legacy
The series being a classic helped Alex Man and Michelle Yim extend their popularity well into the 1980s era.  Most memorable was the opening song composed by Michael Lai (黎小田), lyrics written by Lou Gwok-zim (盧國沾) and sung by Johnny Yip (葉振棠).  The song have since been re-released on numerous albums.

In Hong Kong the series would later spawn the 1981 direct sequel Taichi Master II starring Alex Man, Amy Chan and Leslie Cheung with a Chinese knight-errant theme.  Another reproduction is Tai Chi Master the movie, starring Jet Li and Michelle Yeoh filmed more than a decade later using the same name.

Cast

External links
 Opening theme and ending

References

Asia Television original programming